Kampong Serasa is a village in Brunei-Muara District, Brunei, near the port town Muara. The population was 3,200 in 2016. It is home to Serasa Ferry Terminal, the country's primary international ferry terminal.

Geography 
Kampong Serasa is located in the north-easternmost part of Brunei-Muara District. It is one of the villages within Mukim Serasa. It comprises the original village settlement and the public housing estate Kampong Perpindahan Serasa. It also encompasses Serasa Industrial Site, one of the dedicated industrial estates in the country.

The village has the postcode BT1728.

Facilities 
Serasa Primary School is the village's government primary school, whereas Pengiran Muda Abdul Azim Religious School is the village's government school for the country's Islamic religious primary education.

The village mosque is Kampong Perpindahan Serasa Mosque; it was inaugurated on 28 August 1987 and can accommodate 500 worshippers.

The village is also home to Pengiran Isteri Hajjah Mariam Secondary School, the government secondary school for the residents in Mukim Serasa.

Ferry terminal 
Serasa Ferry Terminal is the main international ferry terminal in Brunei. It mainly serves passengers arriving from and departing to Labuan and Kota Kinabalu in Malaysia by sea. The terminal recorded an annual average of 60,000 tourist arrivals from these destinations.

Places of interest 
 Serasa Beach

References

External links 

Serasa